3.6.3 is the fifth live album by French new wave band  Indochine. It was released in 2003.

Track listing

References

Indochine (band) albums
2003 live albums